Lieutenant General Prakash Mani Tripathi (born 30 June 1935) is an Indian politician and a former member of Lok Sabha from Deoria parliamentary constituency.

He was commissioned in the Indian Army in June 1955 and served in Jammu and Kashmir. He joined 63 Cavalry in February 1957; served in Nagaland as Squadron Commander between 1964-65. During the Indo-Pak War, 1971, he fought in Bangladesh.

He took part in Mizoram-Counter Insurgency operations in 1976; was Commander 3 (I) Armoured Brigade in 1982; Maj. General Officer Commanding, Armoured Division between 1985–88; Director-General, Combat Vehicles, D.R.D.O., between 1988–90; G.O.C. 2 Corps, 1990–92 and Deputy Chief of Army Staff between 1992-93. He was awarded the Ati Vishisht Seva Medal in 1986 and Param Vishisht Seva Medal in 1992.

He was a member of the 11th Lok Sabha (1996-1998) and 13th Lok Sabha, representing Deoria constituency.

References

External links
http://www.electionplans.com/election/state/india/constituency/2533/200904/

Living people
Bharatiya Janata Party politicians from Uttar Pradesh
People from Sultanpur, Uttar Pradesh
India MPs 1996–1997
People from Deoria district
Lok Sabha members from Uttar Pradesh
India MPs 1999–2004
1935 births